Aradhana Jagota is a Screenplay Writer and actress who made her television debut with Anil Kapoor’s 24 (2013). She made her independent film debut with the film Kerry on Kutton (2016). Her short film Khajaou (2016) was one of the few Indian films to get selected at Cannes Film Festival.

Early life
Born 1990 in  New Delhi to a Punjabi family to Vandana Jagota (textile designer) and Sandeep Jagota (Civil Engineer), she has one younger brother, Adhiraj Jagota, who is an architect. She is married to businessman Vinay Matwani. Aradhana attended  Summer Fields School, where she found a liking for acting. Jagota graduated in Mass communication from the Asian School Of Media Studies, where she acted in films produced by her fellow students. Aradhana moved to Mumbai in 2015 to begin a career in modelling and acting and eventually found her calling in Writing.

References

External links
Financial Express Video interview

Indian film actresses
Living people
1990 births
Actresses from Delhi